William Kent (29 March 1856 – 5 February 1906) was a member of the Queensland Legislative Assembly.

Biography
Kent was born at Jondaryan, Queensland, the son of William Kent Snr. and his wife Martha (née Turner) and he was educated privately and in Sydney. For his entire working life Kent worked on stations in the 
Burnett area of Queensland.

On 29 November 1882 he married Emily Celia Sly (died 1952) and together had five sons and two daughters. Kent died in February 1906 at Oakey and was buried in the Drayton and Toowoomba Cemetery.

Public career
Kent won the seat of Burnett in the Queensland Legislative Assembly at the 1899 Queensland colonial election. He held the seat until 1904 when he did not stand at the year's general election.

References

Members of the Queensland Legislative Assembly
1856 births
1906 deaths
19th-century Australian politicians